King Tweety is a 2022 animated direct-to-video comedy film starring the Looney Tunes characters Tweety and Sylvester, produced by Warner Bros. Animation. It is the first new Looney Tunes direct-to-video film since Looney Tunes: Rabbits Run (2015) and the second direct-to-video animated film starring Tweety, after 2000's Tweety's High-Flying Adventure.

Summary 
Tweety unexpectedly becomes next in line for the crown when the queen of an island paradise disappears. His entourage includes motorbike daredevil Granny and sly Sylvester, whose allegiance is tested when he uncovers a sinister plot to eliminate Tweety for good.

Cast 
 Eric Bauza as Tweety Bird, Sylvester, Larry Bird, Handsome Stewart
 Flula Borg as Harold, Thaddeus Fishley Esq., Enthusiastic Crowdgoer
 Carlease Burke as Queen Honk, Candice the Crane
 Jon Daly as Diego von Schniffenstein
 Regi Davis as Rodrigo the Dog, Charlie "Bird" Parker, an Owl
 Dana DeLorenzo as Izza
 Careen Ingle as Floorbo
 Riki Lindhome as Beep Beep
 Candi Milo as Granny, Green Bean, Lady Bird Johnson
 Nicole Thurman as Aoogah, Melaney Blank
 Mark Whitten as Officer Siedes, John Foray

Reception 
Common Sense Media gave the film 3 out of 5 stars. Jennifer Borget, writing for it, "This is a silly caper in the tradition of classic Warner Bros. cartoons. While there's not as much over-the-top slapstick violence and pratfalls as in the 'toons of yesteryear, King Tweety still has its fair share of scenes in which Sylvester is, among other things, chopped up by a ceiling fan, burned by lava, and beaten by dog bones until an exaggerated lump forms on the crown of his feline head. While the story is very much for kids, there are also moments of relatively sophisticated humor intended for older audiences, including an absurdly funny aside concerning the hit 1980s song "Jessie's Girl" by Rick Springfield. While the meta humor is refreshing compared to kids' entertainment that doesn't even bother trying to provide something for the adults watching, overall King Tweety is still a pretty standard story. On the plus side, with no disrespect intended toward the great Mel Blanc, it's worth noting that there is refreshing diversity in the voice cast. All in all, this is an enjoyable, if not unforgettable, update on classic cartoon characters." Alexandria Ingram of FanSided said "This is a fun-filled adventure, perfect for all ages. It’s packed with vibrant, modern animation and some excellent songs you’ll find everyone dancing along with."

Release 
The film was released on DVD and digital on June 14, 2022, with three bonus features episodes of The Sylvester & Tweety Mysteries: "Something Fishy Around Here", "The Maltese Canary" and "The Cat Who Knew Too Much".

The film later premiered on Cartoon Network on November 19, 2022, with it premiering on HBO Max the following day.

References

External links

2022 direct-to-video films
2022 animated films
2022 films
2020s adventure comedy films
Direct-to-video animated films
Film spin-offs
Looney Tunes films
American direct-to-video films
Warner Bros. Animation animated films
Warner Bros. direct-to-video animated films
Tweety films
Sylvester the Cat films
Films about royalty
2020s American animated films
American children's animated adventure films
American children's animated comedy films